Symmoracma is a monotypic moth genus of the family Crambidae described by Edward Meyrick in 1894. Its only species, Symmoracma minoralis, described by Snellen in 1880, is found in Indonesia (Java, Sumbawa), Papua New Guinea, Taiwan, China and Australia, where it has been recorded from Queensland.

The wingspan is about 20 mm. The hindwings are uniform pale.

References

External links
"Symmoracma minoralis (Snellen, 1880)". BioAcoustica. - sound samples

Spilomelinae
Crambidae genera
Taxa named by Edward Meyrick
Monotypic moth genera